Farinelli is an opera in two acts, described as 'serio-comic', by John Barnett, to a libretto by his brother Charles Zachary Barnett. Produced in 1839, it is the third of the composer's large-scale operas, and was the last to reach the stage. The hero is the castrato singer Farinelli, although the storyline of the opera is fictional.

Background
The success of Barnett's 1834 opera, The Mountain Sylph, encouraged further commissions, though neither was as successful as the Sylph. Fair Rosamond appeared in 1837, and Farinelli was premiered on 8 February 1839 at the Theatre Royal, Drury Lane.

The book is an adaptation of the anonymous , premiered in Paris in 1835. The story is based on the legend that, while he was in the service of Philip V of Spain, the beauty of Farinelli's singing was able to cure the king of his melancholia. Whilst it is true that as chamber musician to the king Farinelli had influence at the Spanish court, there is no record of him ever becoming involved with court politics as the opera implies.

For the purpose of the opera Farinelli becomes a tenor; at the premiere the role was taken by the composer and singer Michael William Balfe. In fact the role was originally written as a baritone for Henry Philips. who had taken the role of Hela in the Sylph, but he withdrew following a quarrel with the theatre manager. At the first night, Balfe broke down through a fit of nervousness, and this naturally affected the reception of the opera, which nevertheless received over 50 performances. Barnett's subsequent opera, Kathleen was however never brought to the public stage, although it was rehearsed at the theatre of which Barnett was then part proprietor.

Roles

Synopsis
The opera is set in the Prado. Gil Polo is plotting against the King. Farinelli, who is in love with the chamberlain's niece, Leonora, learns of the plot. His singing rouses the melancholic king to action; Gil is dismissed and exiled, Farinelli is honoured and can marry Leonora.

Notes

Sources
C.Z. Barnett, Farinelli, a serio-comic opera in two acts, London, 1839
C. K. Salaman, English Opera in the Musical Times, vol. 18 no. 411, 1877

Operas
1839 operas
Operas set in Spain
Operas by John Barnett
English-language operas
Operas based on real people
Cultural depictions of Farinelli
Operas set in the 18th century